The statue of Queen Victoria is a bronze sculpture by Mario Raggi. It is currently installed in Victoria Park, in Causeway Bay, Wan Chai District, Hong Kong, near the Causeway Road entrance of the park.

History

This statue was cast in Pimlico, London, and was originally installed at the centre of Statue Square in Central, the main business district of Hong Kong, where it was unveiled by then-Governor William Robinson on 28 May 1896, the day officially appointed for the celebration of the seventy-seventh birthday of Queen Victoria. During the Japanese occupation of Hong Kong, it was taken to Japan to be melted down, along with other statues from the square. After the war, the statue of Queen Victoria was brought back to Hong Kong, but the other statues were never found. In 1952, the late Queen Victoria's statue was restored and placed in Victoria Park.

In 1996, shortly before Hong Kong's handover to China, artist Pun Sing-lui tipped red paint over the statue and smashed its nose with a hammer. Pun was a recent immigrant from Mainland China who had become disillusioned with Hong Kong culture. The vandalism intended to serve as a protest against "dull colonial culture" and to encourage "cultural reunification with "red" China". His actions were decried as vandalism "in discord with popular opinions and the concurrent cultural atmosphere" and an "attack on Hong Kong culture". The statue was subsequently restored, at a cost of $150,000.

See also

 List of statues of Queen Victoria
 Queen's Park, Toronto, where a statue of Queen Victoria by Mario Raggi is also installed

References

External links
 
 

Bronze sculptures in Hong Kong
Causeway Bay
Monuments and memorials in Hong Kong
Outdoor sculptures in Hong Kong
Sculptures of women in Hong Kong
Statues in Hong Kong
Hong Kong
Vandalized works of art